The 2004 Tulane Green Wave football team represented Tulane University in the 2004 NCAA Division I-A football season. The Green Wave played their home games at the Louisiana Superdome and Tad Gormley Stadium. They competed in the West Division of Conference USA. The team was coached by head coach Chris Scelfo.

Schedule

References

Tulane
Tulane Green Wave football seasons
Tulane Green Wave football